Gaylaxicon is a recurring  science fiction, fantasy and horror convention that focused on gay, lesbian, bisexual and transgender topics. It has taken in various locations in the United States and occasionally Canada, often on the East Coast.

Started in 1988 in Provincetown, Massachusetts, Gaylaxicon was organized by member organizations of the Gaylactic Network. The Gaylaxian Science Fiction Society (GSFS) was the New England–based chapter of the Network, which organized the original convention.

The Gaylactic Spectrum Awards were sometimes awarded at Gaylaxicon and were instituted by the organisers of the conference. They are now managed by the Gaylactic Spectrum Awards Council, an independent organization.

Origins 

Gaylaxicon was organized by member organizations of the Gaylactic Network. The Gaylaxian Science Fiction Society (GSFS) is the New England–based chapter of the Network, which organized the original convention in Provincetown, Massachusetts, in 1988.

Spectrum awards 

The Gaylactic Spectrum Awards are given to works of science fiction, fantasy and horror that explore LGBT (lesbian, gay, bisexual, transgender) topics in a positive way. Established in 1998, the awards were initially presented by the Gaylactic Network, with awards first awarded in 1999 at Gaylaxicon. In 2002 the awards were given their own organization, the Gaylactic Spectrum Awards Foundation.

The results were generally announced and presented at Gaylaxicon, although they have also been presented at Worldcon in the past.

Past conventions

See also

LGBT themes in speculative fiction—including science fiction
 LGBT themes in comics
 List of science fiction conventions
 Lambda Literary Awards winners and nominees for science fiction, fantasy and horror

References

External links
Official Website
The Gaylactic Network
The 2005 Gaylaxicon site
The 2006 Gaylaxicon site
The 2010 Gaylaxicon site
The 2011 Gaylaxicon site

Science fiction conventions in the United States
LGBT events in the United States
Recurring events established in 1988
Multigenre conventions